"The Moon Represents My Heart" is a Mandarin song. It was made famous by the Taiwanese singer Teresa Teng. The song is often cited as "one of the most famous and beloved Chinese songs of all time".

Background
It was first sung by Chen Fen-lan in 1972 or 1973 for Chen's album Dreamland but was made famous by Teresa Teng's version later in 1977. Teng's rendition, which is three minutes and 29 seconds long, was described as a "love song with a waltz-like lilt".

Legacy
Teng died of an asthma attack in 1995, but "The Moon Represents My Heart" has been performed frequently around the world since its release by famous singers and musicians such as Nana Mouskouri, Katherine Jenkins, Shila Amzah, Faye Wong, David Tao, Andy Lau, Leslie Cheung, Jon Bon Jovi, Siti Nurhaliza, David Archuleta,  English vocal group Libera and Grammy Award winning American musician Kenny G. The song is considered a "classic," and according to one source, "Chinese all around the world are familiar with [it]."

"The Moon Represents My Heart" is also popular in karaoke, with one chain in Singapore listing it at #42 on their hits list (which made it the highest ranked of all Teng's songs). According to The New York Times, it is one of the best-known Chinese pop songs of all time.

Cultural impact
Until the late 1970s, foreign music had not been allowed into mainland China for several decades. "The Moon Represents My Heart" became one of the first popular foreign songs (called "gangtai" songs) in the country.

Teng's songs over the following decade revolutionized music in China. Her singing, described as "soft, melodious, often whispery and restrained," was considered the "ideal" in gangtai music at that time. The style was in striking contrast to the then officially sanctioned songs in mainland China which were often revolutionary songs, and made a strong impact on its listeners.  She became so popular that "within months the country was literally flooded with [her] songs." "The Moon Represents My Heart", however, is often cited as one of her best-known or most popular pieces.

Before Teng's music arrived, such romantic songs had been nonexistent in China for many years as they were considered bourgeois and decadent. As film director Jia Zhangke later said, "'The Moon Represents My Heart' [was] something completely new. So people of my generation were suddenly infected with this very personal, individual world. Before that, everything was collective..."

Copyright status
Lyricist Sun Yi filed a lawsuit against the Li Ge Record Company. Sun lost the lawsuit, so the company owns the copyright of this song.

References

External links
Video of the song on YouTube

1970s songs
Mandarin-language songs
Teresa Teng songs
Year of song missing
Year of song unknown